Ketabang is an area of Genteng, Surabaya in East Java, Indonesia. The area was planned by Dutch architect Cosman Citroen.

See also
Dutch architecture of Surabaya

References

Populated places in East Java
Surabaya